Barnave is a commune in the Drôme department in southeastern France.

Geography
Barnave is a small village, located opposite the Dome Pie Ferre (2040m) of Glandasse. The territory is crossed by the Barnavette River, a small creek which empties into the Drôme. The village lies 13 kilometres from the canton capital of Luc-en-Diois.

Hamlets

Le Serre: A sheep farm destined for organic meat production.
La Louine: Contains three residential houses and two farms. The distillery, formerly owned by the  CUMA, dates from 1946 but the structure fell into ruin, and was sold in 2007 and is now in production again.
La Bégude: Residential hamlet.
Le Moulin de Jansac: Housing, largely dependent on Recoubeau-Jansac.
La Perlette: The hamlet now has more than one farm and is about 3 km from the village as the crow flies, on the other side of the Drôme.
Les Brunets: Imposing farmhouse converted into a second home.

Population

Architecture
The typical architecture of houses in the village of Barnave is a mixture of Roman influences and early medieval. The stone extracted from fields and limestone form the basis for almost all houses that make up the village. There are still significant remnants of feudal times in Barnave. The ruins of the old village are still visible, as is the traces of a castle. A large portion of the castle wall is still standing. The commune also contains a nineteenth-century church and a temple.

See also
Communes of the Drôme department

References

Communes of Drôme